Alchemax is a fictional megacorporation appearing in American comic books published by Marvel Comics, usually depicted as part of the 2099 universe.

Publication history
The Earth-928 version of Alchemax first appeared in Spider-Man 2099 #1 and was created by Peter David and Rick Leonardi.

The Earth-616 version of Alchemax first appeared in The Superior Spider-Man #19 and was created by Dan Slott and Ryan Stegman.

Fictional company history

Earth-928
Alchemax is a megacorporation operating in the year 2099. It creates products for virtually every consumer need, has entered into endeavors normally deemed nonprofit, and even manufactured an entire city to be maintained exclusively by the corporation. Alchemax has divisions affecting nearly every level of consumer need, society, and government. Its products range from consumer products to military weaponry and private space travel. Alchemax owns and operates a privatized Police Department Public Eye.

Alchemax is also behind another police force called the Eco Corporation.

The company, later headed by Miguel O'Hara, becomes a guiding force for rebuilding Earth after multiple cataclysms.

Earth-616
In the Earth-616 reality, Alchemax started out as Allan Company, which was owned by Liz Allan. The Allan Company became Alchemax when it merged with Normie Osborn's stocks from Oscorp and the last remaining properties of Horizon Labs after its destruction.

Lightmaster assembles a more traditional lineup of the Masters of Evil when he and the Wrecking Crew run afoul of the Superior Spider-Man (Otto Octavius's mind in Spider-Man's body) and his Superior Six while attacking Alchemax in order to steal its technology during a plot to blackmail New York City for money.

When Spider-Man defeats Goblin King and unmasks him as Norman Osborn, the latter reveals that he (under the guise of "Mason Banks") created Alchemax in order to leave a strong empire for his grandson and establish an empire for the Osborn legacy.

Alchemax later competes with Parker Industries for a contract to build a new supervillain prison. In order for Alchemax to win the contract, Mark Raxton and Tiberius Stone enlist Ghost to help sabotage Parker Industries. In the end, when the "All-New, All-Different Marvel" starts, both companies lose that contract to Regent's Empire Unlimited, with the company also being behind Ryker's Island being renamed as the Cellar.

Alchemax (alongside Hammer Industries and Roxxon) is mentioned in a conversation between Spider-Man and Human Torch to have once tried to bid on the renovated Baxter Building only to be outbid by Parker Industries.

Alchemax has a division called Alchemax Genetics that is under the leadership of Robert Chandler. Alchemax Genetics later succeeds in creating several clones of Laura Kinney, though the girls did not manifest her mutation. When the clones Bellona, Gabby, and Zelda escape and begin assassinating Alchemax personnel, they requested her aid in stopping them. Despite Chandler's assurances to the contrary, it soon becomes apparent that Alchemax is not as innocent in the conflict as they claim. Laura and her "sisters" are soon attacked by Alchemax Genetics' head of security, Captain Mooney, who attempts to kill the girls. When X-23 and Wasp are able to destroy the nanites inside the sisters, it triggers a signal that leads Alchemax Genetics' security team to one of Hank Pym's labs where Zelda is killed in the process. Before dying from her wounds after X-23 subdues Captain Mooney, Zelda tells X-23 to put an end to the experiments of Alchemax Genetics.

Tiberius Stone, representing Alchemax, is seen in a secretive meeting at the Universal Bank with Sebastian Shaw of Shaw Industries, Wilson Fisk of Fisk Industries, Dario Agger of Roxxon Energy Corporation, Darren Cross of Cross Technological Enterprises, Zeke Stane of Stane International, Shingen Harada of the Yashida Corporation, Frr'dox of Shi'ar Solutions Consolidated, and Wilhelmina Kensington of Kilgore Arms. The purpose was to confront Agger over his "discourtesies" with the Ten Realms of Asgard. Exterminatrix of the Midas Corporation shows up and knocks out Agger while claiming that she is the new member of their group.

Staff members

Earth-928 version

 Avatarr - The second leader of Alchemax.
 Miguel O'Hara - A scientist in the R&D Department who is the third leader of Alchemax.
 Halloween Jack/Jordan Boone - An Alchemax scientist.
 Paul Phillip-Ravage - Head of Alchemax's anti-pollution arm called Eco Corporation.
 Tyler Stone - Leader of Alchemax who was the head of the R&D Department. He was apparently killed when undersea invaders melted the polar ice caps. He later turned up alive and began to assist Spider-Man 2099 by sending him to 2013-2015 to watch over Alchemax. Then he also assisted Spider-Man 2099 and the other multiversal Spider-Men to find a weakness on the Inheritors.

Earth-616 version
 Liz Allan - The leader of Alchemax.
 Normie Osborn - Son of Harry Osborn and Liz Allan and grandson of Norman Osborn.
 Tiberius Stone - The former CEO of Valistone who has worked with Kingpin, Tinkerer, and the Goblin Nation. He is revealed to be the grandfather of Tyler Stone.
 Mason Banks - An Alchemax executive who was actually Norman Osborn in disguise.
 Miguel O'Hara - When trapped in the present, Spider-Man 2099 took on the alias of Michael O'Mara and became Tiberius Stone's assistant in order to keep an eye on him.
 Mark Raxton - The former Molten Man who works as a member of Alchemax's security force.
 Mac Gargan - An "outside consultant" hired by Tiberius Stone as a private bodyguard and to commit more unscrupulous actions while off the record.
 Robert Chandler - The Director of Alchemax Genetics who was involved with the project to clone X-23, though his exact position in the company is unknown. His son was targeted for assassination by the escaped clones.
 Captain Mooney - Chandler's chief of security at Alchemax Genetics.

Other versions

Secret Wars (2015)
During the "Secret Wars" storyline, Alchemax is located in the Battleworld domain of 2099 which is based from the remnants of Earth-23291. Alchemax was founded by Tyler Stone who later became handicapped and handed the company over to Miguel Stone. In addition, Tyler Stone had recreated 2099's version of the Avengers to work for Alchemax.

Timestorm 2009–2099
In the Timestorm 2009–2099 miniseries, Alchemax's high command is seen severely altering the timeline. This causes many alterations for the 2099 timeline such as Tyler Stone's son being genetically different from birth.

In other media

Television
Alchemax appears in the Marvel's Spider-Man episode "Cloak and Dagger". This version is a science firm run by CEO Tiberius Stone, who experimented on Cloak and Dagger and gave them their powers.

Film
Alchemax appears in the animated film Spider-Man: Into the Spider-Verse. This version is run by Dr. Olivia Octavius and funded by the Kingpin. Alchemax helped develop the Super-Collider as part of Kingpin's plot to find living alternate reality versions of his family Vanessa and Richard Fisk within the multiverse.

Video games
 Alchemax, its scientists, and police force, the Public Eye Patrol, appear in the 2099 segments of Spider-Man: Shattered Dimensions. The last of these segments takes place inside the Alchemax building and introduces Dr. Serena Patel, the head of Alchemax's Shadow Division and this time period's version of Doctor Octopus who was responsible for creating Hobgoblin 2099 and manipulating Scorpion.
 Both the 2099 and present day versions of Alchemax appear in Spider-Man: Edge of Time. In the game, Alchemax scientist Walker Sloan (voiced by Val Kilmer) builds a time portal to travel from 2099 to the 1970s to alter history and establish Alchemax early, allowing the company to take control of New York, which also results in the present day Spider-Man working at Alchemax instead of the Daily Bugle. Sloan also uses Anti-Venom, whom he controls with several neural implants, to try and kill the present day Spider-Man. While he nearly succeeds, Spider-Man 2099 saves his predecessor and defeats Anti-Venom. Freed from Sloan's control, Anti-Venom attacks him and Otto Octavius, inadvertently sending all three of them through the time portal, fusing them into the monstrous Atrocity. The two Spider-Men later discover that the CEO of Alchemax and the mastermind behind Sloan's plot is Peter Parker's future self who used Sloan's time machine to create a time storm so he can use its energy to recreate history in his image. The heroic Spider-Men eventually defeat the future Parker and Atrocity while destroying the time machine, dispersing the time storm and restoring history.
 The 2099 version of Alchemax appears in Lego Marvel Super Heroes 2. It is among the locations in the Nueva York section in Chronopolis.
 The present day Alchemax appears in Marvel's Spider-Man. This version is a chemical plant located in Manhattan and played a role in Tombstone receiving his powers. Tombstone's gang raid it to create a new designer drug, but Spider-Man is able to defeat them.

See also
 Cross Technological Enterprises
 Oscorp
 Parker Industries
 Roxxon Energy Corporation
 Stark Industries

References

External links
 Alchemax (Earth-928) at Marvel Wiki
 Alchemax (Earth-616) at Marvel Wiki
 Alchemax at Comic Vine

Marvel 2099
Fictional companies
Spider-Man characters